The 2008 Texas State Bobcats football team represented Texas State University–San Marcos in the 2008 NCAA Division I FCS football season. The Bobcats led by second year head coach Brad Wright, played their home games at Bobcat Stadium as a member of the Southland Conference. They finished the season with a record of eight wins and five losses (8–5, 5–2 Southland). Despite finishing in second place in conference play, they earned the Southland Conference's automatic bid, due to the conference champion Central Arkansas being ineligible for the postseason due to their transition period after moving up from Division II. They finished the season with a loss at Montana in the First Round of the FCS playoffs.

Schedule

References

Texas State
Texas State Bobcats football seasons
Texas State Bobcats football